A listing of the chapters of Phi Beta Kappa Society. Active chapters are indicated in bold; inactive chapters are indicated in italic.

Notes

References

External links
Guide to the University of Chicago Phi Beta Kappa Beta of Illinois Chapter Records 1899-1948 at the University of Chicago Special Collections Research Center

Phi Beta Kappa